Admiral Sir Lionel Halsey,  (26 February 1872 – 26 October 1949) was a Royal Navy officer and courtier.

Early life and career
Halsey was born in London, the fourth son of Sir Thomas Frederick Halsey, 1st Baronet. After primary education at Stubbington House, Fareham, Hampshire, he entered the Britannia in January 1885. He was commissioned a sub-lieutenant on 14 July 1891. In July 1893 he was posted to the Royal Yacht Victoria and Albert and was promoted lieutenant on 28 August 1893. He served with the Mediterranean Fleet and then on the North America and West Indies Station, before joining . In the Second Boer War he commanded a battery of naval guns in the Defence of Ladysmith, for which he was mentioned in despatches and promoted commander on 1 January 1901. He was posted to the cruiser  as executive officer and served in her in the Mediterranean until June 1902, when he was posted to the signal school at HMS Victory. On their return, the Good Hope was commissioned as flagship of the Cruiser Squadron of the Home Fleet.

In January 1905 Halsey was appointed Naval Member of the new Royal Naval Volunteer Reserve Committee at the Admiralty, and was promoted captain on 30 June 1905. In August 1905 he took command of Powerful, as flag captain to Sir Wilmot Fawkes as Commander-in-Chief Australia Station. It was during this cruise that Halsey was given a Māori war skirt which he wore during the naval battles at Heligoland and Dogger Bank. He was appointed a Companion of the Order of St Michael and St George (CMG) on 8 December 1913. On 19 September 1914 he was appointed a Naval Aide-de-camp to the King.

First World War
After the outbreak of the First World War, Halsey commanded the New Zealand at the Battle of Heligoland and the Battle of Dogger Bank in January 1915, for which he was again mentioned in despatches. During the battles Halsey wore the Māori piupiu over his uniform, setting a tradition followed for the duration of the war.
. He was granted a special Good Service Pension in July 1915. He was present at the Battle of Jutland, being mentioned in despatches for a third time and appointed a Companion of the Order of the Bath (CB) on 3 June 1916 (in the King's Birthday Honours). On 15 September 1916 he was appointed an Officer of the Légion d'honneur and was promoted to commander in 1917.

On 4 December 1916 Halsey was appointed Fourth Sea Lord at the Admiralty, becoming Third Sea Lord in May 1917. In April 1917 he was promoted rear admiral. In that same year, he was also awarded the Japanese Order of the Rising Sun, Gold and Silver Star, which represents the second highest of eight classes associated with the award. In September 1918 he returned to sea in the battle cruiser  in command of the 2nd Battlecruiser Squadron of the Grand Fleet and was present at the German surrender at Scapa Flow. He was promoted to Knight Commander of the Order of St Michael and St George in 1918 and in 1919 received the Navy Distinguished Service Medal of the United States. For this he was appointed a Knight Commander of the Royal Victorian Order (KCVO) on 1 December 1919, and advanced to Knight Grand Cross (GCVO) on 11 October 1920.

Post-war

In November 1920 Halsey was appointed Comptroller and Treasurer to the Prince of Wales. He became a member of the Prince's council in 1920, and an extra equerry in 1921. He was promoted vice admiral on 5 July 1921, and retired from the navy on 1 November 1922. He was appointed a Knight Commander of the Order of the Indian Empire (KCIE) in 1922 after the Prince's visit to India, advanced to Knight Grand Cross of the Order of St Michael and St George (GCMG) on 16 October 1925 following the Prince's visit to Africa and South America, and promoted admiral on 4 October 1926. In 1926 he was appointed a Deputy Lieutenant for the County of Bedford. He was also awarded the Japanese Order of the Rising Sun 1st Class in 1922.

In 1936 he was dismissed from the staff of King Edward VIII, as the Prince of Wales had now become. This was probably due to his opposition to Wallis Simpson becoming queen. In 1937, however, he was appointed an extra equerry to the new King George VI and took part in the coronation procession as acting Keeper of the Jewel House. He died in 1949 at the age of 77 and is buried in the churchyard of St Leonard's church in Old Warden in Bedfordshire.

Footnotes

References

External links
 

|-

|-

1872 births
1949 deaths
Military personnel from London
Lords of the Admiralty
Royal Navy admirals of World War I
Royal Navy personnel of the Second Boer War
Knights Grand Cross of the Order of St Michael and St George
Knights Grand Cross of the Royal Victorian Order
Knights Commander of the Order of the Indian Empire
Companions of the Order of the Bath
Officiers of the Légion d'honneur
Grand Cordons of the Order of the Rising Sun
Younger sons of baronets
People educated at Stubbington House School
Lionel